Lahiri Lahiri Lahirilo is a 2002 Indian Telugu-language musical-family drama film written, directed and produced by YVS Chowdary under the banner Bommarillu. The film stars four pairs Nandamuri Harikrishna, Bhanupriya, Suman, Rachana, Aditya, Ankitha, Vineeth and Sanghavi in the lead roles. Veteran actress Lakshmi played the main villain role in this film. This film is a hit at the box-office. The film won three Nandi Awards. The film's title is based on a song from Mayabazar (1957).

Plot 
Nani (Aditya) and Bala (Ankitha) study in the same college. The story begins with Nani arranging a marriage for his friends Veera Venkata Satya Narayana (Chitram Srinu) and Naga Venkata Ratna Kumari in Annavaram with the help of his classmate John David (Venu Madhav). Bala also joins the marriage. She gets to know that Nani is an orphan and starts liking Nani's attitude and behaviour. Nani also has same feelings towards Bala but he doesn't reveal them to her. After the marriage, John David tells her that he and Nani have arranged this marriage as part of their business A-1 Match Fixing Centre and Nani is actually a marriage broker who arranges marriages for making money. She gets upset when Nani bids her good bye saying that there is hardly any friendship between them.

Indu (Bhanupriya), Chandu (Rachana) and Sindhu (Sanghavi) are three daughters of Rama Krishna (Ranganath) and nieces of Ammayiamma (Rama Prabha). Indu is obsessed with cleanliness, Chandu is scared of lizards and Sindhu is a sincere worshipper. Rama Krishna lost his wife and his brother in law (Ammayiamma's husband) in a car accident and he believes the reason to be not believing in astrology. He strongly decides to get his three daughters married to three brothers only with whom their horoscopes match perfectly. Ammayiamma approaches Nani for finding suitable matches for her nieces. Nani suggests Ammayiamma the three sons of Balaramaiah Naidu (K. Viswanath) and Sathyapriya of Ramapuram village - Krishnama Naidu (Nandamuri Harikrishna) for Indu, Chandrama Naidu (Suman) for Chandu and Srinivasa Naidu (Vineeth) for Sindhu. Nani goes to Ramapuram as the younger brother of Indu, Chandu and Sindhu for Dasara festival celebrations and all four stay in the house of Punju Raju (K. Chakravarthy) which is exactly opposite to Balaramaiah Naidu's house. Nani plans to create love between the couples and get them married.

In his efforts to unite the three couples, he bumps into Bala again who is the only younger sister of the three brothers. Both exchange their love for each other but are scared to reveal it to her family. From then, the story takes a twist with the entry of Achamamba (Lakshmi) who was once in love with Balaramaiah Naidu and is waiting to take revenge on him for not marrying her. By winning in the village cockfight, she convinces Balaramaiah Naidu for getting his daughter Bala married to foreign returned son of her brother (Jaya Prakash Reddy). The rest of the plot is all about how Achamamba's evil plans are destroyed by Krishnama Naidu and the four couples got married.

Cast 

 Nandamuri Harikrishna as Krishnama Naidu
 Bhanupriya as Indu
 Suman as Chandrama Naidu
 Rachana as Chandu
 Aditya as Nani
 Ankitha as Bala
 Vineeth as Srinivasa Naidu
 Sanghavi as Sindhu
 Lakshmi  as Achchamamba
 K. Viswanath as Balaramaiah Naidu
 K. Chakravarthy as Punju Raju
 Kanta Rao as priest
 Sathyapriya as Balaramaiah Naidu's wife
 Jaya Prakash Reddy as Achchamamba's brother's son
 Ranganath as Rama Krishna
 Rama Prabha as Ammayiamma
 Achyuth as Suryam
 Kalpana as Suryam's wife
 Venu Madhav as John David
 Chitram Seenu as Veera Venkata Satya Narayana
 Gokina Rama Rao
 G. V. Sudhakar Naidu

Soundtrack
The soundtrack of this film is composed by M. M. Keeravani and all the lyrics were written by Sirivennela Seetharama Sastry. The soundtrack received positive reviews. The sound track included huge number of tracks and lengthy songs which met with huge success. The tracklist featured eminent singers like Keeravani himself, K.S.Chitra, Sonu Nigam, Udit Narayan, Kumar Sanu, Sukhwinder Singh, Sunitha Upadrashta, P. Unnikrishnan, Kalyan Koduri & Ganga. All the tracks were hit tracks, but the track "Kallaloki Kallu Petti" sung by K.S.Chitra and Udit Narayan became a huge chartbuster. "Mantramedo", "Ohoho Chilakkamma", "Nesthama", "Lahiri Lahiri Lahirilo" were other chartbusters.

Awards

Nandi Awards - 2002-2003
Best Character Actor - Harikrishna
Best Character Actress - Bhanupriya
Best Female Comedian - Rama Prabha

References

External links 
 

2002 films
Indian drama films
Films scored by M. M. Keeravani
2000s Telugu-language films
Films directed by Y. V. S. Chowdary